Craig Menear (born ) is an American business executive. He serves as the chairman and is the former chief executive officer of The Home Depot.

Early life
Menear was born  in Flint, Michigan. His father worked as a tool and die maker for General Motors.

Menear was educated at the Flint Central High School, graduating in 1975. He graduated from Michigan State University's Eli Broad College of Business in 1979.

Career
Menear began his career at several retailers. His first post-grad job was at Montgomery Ward, a department store chain.  He previously worked for Builders Emporium and was a distribution manager for IKEA prior to working for Home Depot.

Menear joined Home Depot in 1997. He became executive vice president of merchandising in 2007. Succeeding Frank Blake in these roles, Menear has served as its chief executive officer since November 2014, and as its chairman since February 2015. He was given $11.5 million in 2016.

In January 2022, The Home Depot announced he would be stepping down as the CEO and President effective March 1, 2022 while continuing to serve as the chairman of the board. He is replaced by former executive vice president Ted Decker.

Civic activities
Menear is a donor to his alma mater, Michigan State University. He has also supported initiatives through Home Depot, including the Home Depot Political Action Committee and a disaster relief fund.

References

Living people
People from Flint, Michigan
Michigan State University alumni
American chairpersons of corporations
American chief executives
The Home Depot people
Year of birth missing (living people)
Flint Central High School alumni